Jessica Barth is an American actress, known for portraying Tami-Lynn McCafferty in the film Ted and its sequel.

Education
After high school, she took classes at the Wilma Theater, and later attended La Salle University, where she studied communications for two years; she later earned a Bachelor of Arts at West Chester University, where she studied theater and creative writing.

Career
Barth built up her résumé while also working at three different restaurants in Los Angeles. She began her acting career with theater plays, with her first television role on The District in 2004 and her first film role in Neo Ned in 2005. Barth earned worldwide recognition with her appearance in Seth MacFarlane's 2012 film Ted as Tami-Lynn, the title character's love interest. She reprised the role in Ted 2 (2015).

In 2012, Barth accused her manager David Guillod of drugging and sexually assaulting her. She re-stated the accusation in 2017. In June 2020, Guillod was charged with 11 felony counts of sex-related crimes, including kidnapping and rape, stemming from accusations made by other women.

In 2017, Barth revealed that she was a victim of sexual harassment from Harvey Weinstein. She met with Weinstein in his hotel suite for a presumed business meeting where he "alternated between offering to cast her in a film and demanding a naked massage in bed." MacFarlane, who directed Barth in both Ted movies, stated his support for her allegations in a statement on Twitter.

Filmography

Film

Television

References

External links
 
 

Living people
Year of birth missing (living people)
West Chester University alumni
La Salle University alumni
21st-century American actresses
American film actresses
American stage actresses
American television actresses
American voice actresses